The canton of Maubeuge is an administrative division of the Nord department, northern France. It was created at the French canton reorganisation which came into effect in March 2015. Its seat is in Maubeuge.

It consists of the following communes:

Assevent
Bersillies
Bettignies
Boussois
Élesmes
Ferrière-la-Grande
Gognies-Chaussée
Jeumont
Louvroil
Mairieux
Marpent
Maubeuge
Vieux-Reng
Villers-Sire-Nicole

References

Cantons of Nord (French department)